The Catholic Church of Iraq has no national (Latin) episcopal conference, but is united in an inter-rite Assembly of the Catholic Bishops of Iraq, given its diversity :
 a Latin non-Metropolitan Archdiocese (participation in the transcontinental Arab Region Latin Bishops conference)
 divided over four Eastern Catholic rite-specific particular churches : a Patriarchate, two Metropolitan - and six other archeparchies, three more eparchies and two (pre-diocesan) Patriarchal exarchates.

There is an Apostolic Nunciature to Iraq in the national capital Baghdad, as papal diplomatic representation at embassy-level (Established as Apostolic Delegation of Mesopotamia, Kurdistan and Lesser Armenia, in 1937 renamed as Apostolic Delegation of Iraq, promoted on 1966.10.14), into which is also vested the Apostolic Nunciature to neighbouring (Trans)Jordan.

Current Latin dioceses

Exempt Jurisdictions 
 Archdiocese of Baghdad (non-Metropolitan)

Current Eastern Catholic dioceses

Chaldean Catholic Church 
(Chaldean - = Syro-Oriental Rite)

 Chaldean Catholic Patriarchate of Babylon (at Al-Mansour, Baghdad; initially Diocese of Seleucia-Ctesifonte)

Chaldean Catholic Ecclesiastical Province of Baghdad 
 Metropolitan Archeparchy of Baghdad 
Chaldean Catholic Eparchy of Alquoch 
Chaldean Catholic Eparchy of Amadiyah and Zaku 
Chaldean Catholic Eparchy of Aqra

Chaldean Catholic Ecclesiastical Province of Kirkuk 
 nominally Metropolitan Chaldean Catholic Archeparchy of Kirkuk-Sulaimaniya (no actual suffragan)

Chaldean Catholic Sui juris Jurisdictions 
 Chaldean Catholic Archeparchy of Basra (Bassorah, successor of Perat-Maishan )
 Chaldean Catholic Archeparchy of Arbil 
 Chaldean Catholic Archeparchy of Mosul

Other Eastern rites Sui juris Jurisdictions 
(no Metropolitan, no Suffragan)

 Syrian Catholic (Antiochian Rite)
 Syrian Catholic Archeparchy of Baghdad 
 Syrian Catholic Archeparchy of Mosul 
 Patriarchal Exarchate of Basra and the Gulf

 Armenian Catholic (Armenian rite)
 Archeparchy of Baghdad

 (Greek-)Melkite Catholic (Byzantine Rite)
 Melkite Catholic Patriarchal Exarchate of Iraq

Defunct jurisdictions

Titular sees 
 Two Episcopal Titular bishoprics : Anbar of the Chaldeans, Hirta (now Latin)

Other defunct jurisdictions 
TO BE COMPLETED?

Apart from the precursors of the current sees : Latin : Mission sui iuris of Mossul (suppressed)
 Apostolic Prefecture of Syria and Cilicia (formerly and later Mission sui iuris)Eastern Catholic :'' 
 Chaldean Catholic Eparchy of Sulaimaniya (merged into Kirkuk)
 Chaldean Catholic Eparchy of Zaku (Zākhō; merged into Amadiyah = Amadia)

See also 
 List of Catholic dioceses (structured view)
 Christianity in Iraq

Sources and external links 
 GCatholic.org - data for all sections.
 Catholic-Hierarchy entry.

Iraq
Catholic dioceses